The simplicial complex recognition problem is a computational problem in algebraic topology. Given a simplicial complex, the problem is to decide whether it is homeomorphic to another fixed simplicial complex. The problem is undecidable for complexes of dimension 5 or more.

Background 
An abstract simplicial complex (ASC) is family of sets that is closed under taking subsets (the subset of a set in the family is also a set in the family). Every abstract simplicial complex has a unique geometric realization in a Euclidean space as a geometric simplicial complex (GSC), where each set with k elements in the ASC is mapped to a (k-1)-dimensional simplex in the GSC. Thus, an ASC provides a finite representation of a geometric object. Given an ASC, one can ask several questions regarding the topology of the GSC it represents.

Homeomorphism problem 
The homeomorphism problem is: given two finite simplicial complexes representing smooth manifolds, decide if they are homeomorphic. 

 If the complexes are of dimension at most 3, then the problem is decidable. This follows from the proof of the geometrization conjecture.
 For every d ≥ 4, the homeomorphism problem for d-dimensional simplicial complexes is undecidable. 
The same is true if "homeomorphic" is replaced with "piecewise-linear homeomorphic".

Recognition problem 
The recognition problem is a sub-problem of the homeomorphism problem, in which one simplicial complex is given as a fixed parameter. Given another simplicial complex as an input, the problem is to decide whether it is homeomorphic to the given fixed complex.

 The recognition problem is decidable for the 3-dimensional sphere . That is, there is an algorithm that can decide whether any given simplicial complex is homeomorphic to the boundary of a 4-dimensional ball. 
 The recognition problem is undecidable for the d-dimensional sphere  for any d ≥ 5. The proof is by reduction to the word problem for groups. From this, it can be proved that the recognition problem is undecidable for any fixed compact d-dimensional manifold with d ≥ 5. 
 As of 2014, it is open whether the recognition problem is decidable for the 4-dimensional sphere .

Manifold problem 
The manifold problem is: given a finite simplicial complex, is it homeomorphic to a manifold? The problem is undecidable; the proof is by reduction from the word problem for groups.

References 

Undecidable problems
Simplicial sets